is a railway station in Funabashi, Japan, operated by East Japan Railway Company (JR East), Tokyo Metro, and the Tōyō Rapid Railway. It is the easternmost station of the Tokyo subway network, lying in Chiba Prefecture.

Lines
Nishi-Funabashi Station is served by the following lines.
East Japan Railway Company
Chūō-Sōbu Line
Musashino Line
Keiyō Line
Tokyo Metro
Tōzai Line
Tōyō Rapid Railway
Tōyō Rapid Railway Line

Station layout
The station consists of six island platforms serving eleven tracks on two levels (another two tracks are used by Sōbu Line (Rapid) trains which do not stop at the station). The high-level station serves the Keiyō and Musashino Lines. The low level is served by the Sōbu, Tōzai and Tōyō Rapid Railway Lines. The low level can be subdivided into two sections, one served by trains running into Tokyo via the Sōbu Line and the other by trains running into Tokyo via the Tōzai Line, since all the track connections between the two lines are east of the station.

Platform 7 is mainly used for Tōzai Line trains (mainly for reversing them), and platform 8 is exclusively  for Tōzai Line trains.

The high-level station consists of platforms 9 to 12.

Ground-level platforms

Elevated platforms

History

The station opened on the Sobu Line on November 10, 1958, initially serving passengers only. It moved into a new station building on December 15, 1968, when the line was quadrupled.

The Eidan Tozai Line arrived here on March 29, 1969, and through service between the two lines commenced. Freight services commenced on April 8.
 
The high-level station opened on October 2, 1978, when platforms 9 and 10 (presentday 11 and 12) started being used as the terminus of the Musashino Line. On March 3, 1986, platforms 9 and 10 opened for use by the initial section of the Keiyo Line (from here to Chiba-Minato). Freight services ceased on November 1, 1986.
 
The next part of the Keiyō Line (Shin-Kiba to Nishi-Funabashi and Minami-Funabashi) opened on December 1, 1988. At the same time, through services began between the Keiyo and Musashino Lines.

The Tōyō Rapid Railway Line opened on April 27, 1996, with through services to the Eidan Tōzai Line from the first day.

The station facilities of the Tozai Line were inherited by Tokyo Metro after the privatization of the Teito Rapid Transit Authority (TRTA) in 2004.

The Dila Nishi-Funabashi station building complex opened on January 15, 2005.

Passenger statistics
In fiscal 2013, the JR East station was used by 130,814 passengers daily (boarding passengers only), making it the 25th-busiest station operated by JR East. In fiscal 2013, the Tokyo Metro station was used by an average of 279,770 passengers per day (exiting and entering passengers). Note that the statistics consider passengers who travel through Nishi-Funabashi station on a through service as users of the station, even if they did not disembark at the station. In fiscal 2011, the Tōyō Rapid Railway station was used by an average of 52,004 passengers daily (boarding passengers only), making it the busiest station operated by the company. The daily passenger figures for JR East and Tokyo Metro in previous years are as shown below.

 Note that JR East figures are for boarding passengers only.

Bus terminal

Highway buses 
 Airport Limousine; For Haneda Airport
 Polar Star; For Sendai Station
 For Fuji-Q Highland and Kawaguchiko Station
 For Chino, Matsumoto Bus Terminal(Matsumoto Station), Azumino, and Nagano Station
 Fantasia Nagoya; For Hoshigaoka Station, Motoyama Station, Chikusa Station, Sakae Station, and Nagoya Station
 Yamato; For Tenri Station, Kintetsu Nara Station, Nara Station, Kintetsu-Kōriyama Station, Chūgū-ji, Hōryū-ji, Ōji Station, and Goidō Station
 For Senri-Chūō Station, Momoyamadai Station, Shin-Ōsaka Station, Umeda Station, and Sannomiya Station
 South Wave; For Sakaihigashi Station, Sakai Station, Izumigaoka Station, Wakayama Station, and Wakayamashi Station

See also
 List of railway stations in Japan

References

External links

 JR East station information 
 Tokyo Metro station information 
 Toyo Rapid Railway station information 

Railway stations in Chiba Prefecture
Tokyo Metro Tozai Line
Funabashi
Railway stations in Japan opened in 1958
Musashino Line